The 2012 Milan–San Remo was the 103rd running of the Milan–San Remo single-day cycling race.

The race was won by  rider Simon Gerrans, who was part of a three-man group that battled for the victory, in a sprint finish. Gerrans finished ahead of 's Fabian Cancellara – the winner of the race in 2008 – and 's Vincenzo Nibali, who completed the podium.

Teams 
As Milan–San Remo was a UCI World Tour event, all 18 UCI ProTeams were invited automatically and obligated to send a squad. Seven other squads were given wildcard places into the race, and as such, formed the event's 25-team peloton. Each team started with eight riders, making a starting peloton of 200.

The 25 teams that competed in the race were:

Results

References

External links

Milan–San Remo
March 2012 sports events in Europe
Milan - San Remo, 2012
Milan-Sanremo
2012 in road cycling